Dorian "Doe" Boyland is a former Major League Baseball first baseman who was drafted in the second round of the 1976 Major League Baseball Draft by the Pittsburgh Pirates. After his playing career, he opened a series of car dealerships across the United States.

Career
After graduating from South Shore High School in Chicago, Boyland attended the University of Wisconsin–Oshkosh to play college basketball for the Titans but eventually earned a spot on the school's baseball team.

Boyland played in just 21 games with the Pirates in 1978, 1979, and 1981 and was later traded to the San Francisco Giants.

He is the only MLB player whose first at bat in the majors was a strikeout while sitting on the bench after he was removed with a 1-2 count. On September 4, 1978, the Pirates and the New York Mets played a doubleheader. In the first game, the Pirates tied the game at 4-4 in the 7th. With one out and a man on first, Pirates manager Chuck Tanner pinch-hit Boyland for relief pitcher Ed Whitson, sending the 23-year-old rookie up for his first-ever at bat. After going up 1-2 on Boyland, Mets pitcher Skip Lockwood was pulled for Kevin Kobel, prompting Tanner to counter by replacing Boyland with pinch-hitter Rennie Stennett. Stenett struck out, but scoring rules assign the strikeout to Boyland.

Boyland made his last appearance on the Pirates on October 4, 1981. That December, he was traded to the San Francisco Giants for Tom Griffin. In 1982, he retired.

Post-baseball career
Boyland opened a series of car dealerships in Florida, Oregon, Wisconsin, and other states after his playing career.

In 2019, Boyland received an honorary doctorate degree from the University of Wisconsin-Oshkosh.

In 2021, New York Post baseball columnist Joel Sherman reported Boyland was not interested in working in the Mets front office amidst their search for a president of baseball operations and was "happy to run his car dealerships."

References

External links

Pura Pelota (Venezuelan Winter League)

1955 births
Living people
African-American baseball players
Baseball players from Chicago
Columbus Clippers players
Major League Baseball first basemen
Navegantes del Magallanes players
American expatriate baseball players in Venezuela
Phoenix Giants players
Pittsburgh Pirates players
Portland Beavers players
Salem Pirates players
Shreveport Captains players
Wisconsin–Oshkosh Titans baseball players
21st-century African-American people
20th-century African-American sportspeople
Wisconsin–Oshkosh Titans men's basketball players